The Eritrean Liberation Front (ELF), informally known as Jebha, was the main independence movement in Eritrea which sought Eritrea's independence from Ethiopia during the 1960s and the early 1970s.

History

Origins
In the late 1950s, an unorganized political movement seeking independence was secretly active as small cells. And in July 1960, the ELF was openly established in Cairo by Idris Muhammad Adam and other Eritrean intellectuals and students. In 1961 Hamid Idris Awate formed the armed wing of the ELF and declared the armed struggle for independence. Led by Awate, the ELF came into violent conflict with the government on September 1, 1961, using guerrilla war tactics to continue the struggle. Though the movement posed great problems for the Ethiopian government and army, it was also facing internal political conflicts in the very late 1960s. In the 1970s, a group of its members split the movement and formed the Eritrean People's Liberation Front, a more left-wing rebel movement. By the 1980s, the People's Liberation Front had replaced the original Eritrean Liberation Front as the main rebel group. Following the expulsion of the ELF from Eritrean land, the organization split into three groups: the Eritrean liberation front-Revolutionary Council, led by Ahmed Nasser, the Eritrean liberation front-Central Leadership, which eventually united in 1987 with the Eritrean People's Liberation Front, and the remaining faction led by Abdalla Idriss retained the original name. When Eritrea did gain independence in the early 1990s, the People's Liberation Front changed into the People's Front for Democracy and Justice with the addition of former ELF members while the balance became a small rebel group in the nether reaches of Sudan.

Relations with Tigrayan political movements
In its early years, ELF operated in various areas of the current day Tigray and Afar, such as eastern, central, and western Tigray bordering Eritrea.

The ELF sought to expand the borders of Eritrea beyond the Italian-defined colonial boundaries into the territory of Tigray., such as:

Twenty-first century
, the ELF is a member of the umbrella opposition alliance in Eritrea, the Eritrean National Alliance. They were receiving military support from Ethiopia and from the interim government of Somalia based at Baidoa around 2006.

Groups that are splinters of the ELF
The Eritrean Liberation Front-Popular liberation forces was organized around Osman Saleh Sabbe, Romedan Mohammed Nur and Isaias Afewerki. Another split affected within the organization with the emergence of Eritrean People's Liberation Front in 1970. The 1982 Rasai Incident led to a split between the Abdellah Idris faction and Ahmed Mohammed Nasser's Eritrean Liberation Front-Revolutionnary Council. Ahmed's group was then affected by another split with the creation of Eritrean Liberation Front-Central Leadership around Ibrahim Toteel
and Zemheret Yohannes.

Organizations affiliated with the Eritrean Liberation Front

 General Union of Eritrean Students
 General Union of Eritrean Workers
 General Union of Eritrean Women
 General Union of Eritrean Peasants
 Eritrean Red Cross and Red Crescent Society

References

External links
List of incidents attributed to the Eritrean Liberation Front on the START database

Eritrean nationalism
Eritrean War of Independence
Factions of the Ethiopian Civil War
Guerrilla organizations
National liberation movements in Africa
Rebel groups in Eritrea
Rebel groups in Ethiopia
Organizations established in 1960